Second Hand Wife is a 1933 American pre-Code drama film written and directed by Hamilton MacFadden. The film stars Sally Eilers, Helen Vinson, Ralph Bellamy, and Victor Jory. The film was released on January 8, 1933 by Fox Film Corporation.

Plot

Cast        
Sally Eilers as Sandra Trumbull
Helen Vinson as Betty Cavendish
Ralph Bellamy as Carter Cavendish
Victor Jory as Lotzi Vajda
Nella Walker as Mrs. Cavendish

References

External links 
 
 

1933 films
American black-and-white films
Fox Film films
American drama films
1933 drama films
Films directed by Hamilton MacFadden
1930s English-language films
1930s American films